Crataegus succulenta is a species of hawthorn known by the common names fleshy hawthorn, succulent hawthorn, and round-fruited cockspurthorn. It is "the most wide-ranging hawthorn in North America", native to much of southern Canada, and the United States as far south as Arizona, New Mexico, Kansas, Missouri, North Carolina, and Tennessee. In this wide area there are many variant forms that have received species names, but can also be considered as synonyms. It is thought to be the parent, along with Crataegus crus-galli, of the tetraploid species Crataegus persimilis.

The fruit is edible and can be made into jelly or crushed to make tea.

Images

References

succulenta
Edible fruits
Flora of North America
Trees of the Northeastern United States
Flora without expected TNC conservation status